Ekkehard Klemm (born 1958), is a German conductor.

Biography
Klemm was born in Chemnitz, Germany, and studied conducting, composition and piano at the Hochschule für Musik Carl Maria von Weber Dresden. He served as principal conductor of the Opera House in Greifswald (1988–94), chief conductor of the Vorpommern Theater and conductor  of the Staatstheater at the Gärtnerplatz in Munich until 1999.

In 2003 Klemm  was appointed first principal teacher of conducting at the Hochschule für Musik Carl Maria von Weber Dresden.

References

External links
Ekkehard Klemm official website

1958 births
Living people
German male conductors (music)
Hochschule für Musik Carl Maria von Weber alumni
Academic staff of the Hochschule für Musik Carl Maria von Weber
21st-century German conductors (music)
21st-century German male musicians